Justice Muhammad Sair Ali (born 19 November 1947) is a Pakistani judge, professor of law, and who formerly served as the Justice of the Supreme Court of Pakistan from 2009 until his retirement in 2011. Prior to the appointment at the Supreme Court, he served as the Lahore High Court judge from 2001 until 2008. He has also played a role in lawyers movement in Pakistan On 4 August 2014, he was appointed as the acting chairman and election commissioner of the Pakistan Cricket Board chairman.

References

20th-century Pakistani lawyers
21st-century Pakistani judges
Living people
Year of birth missing (living people)